Louis J. Massiah is an American documentary filmmaker, MacArthur Prize winner, and community activist who has worked with Philadelphians to develop filmmaking skills and to access media resources in order to record their own stories.

He graduated from Cornell University with a B.A., and from Massachusetts Institute of Technology with an M.S. in documentary filmmaking.

He has been an artist-in-residence and on faculty at City College of New York, Princeton University, Ithaca College, the University of Pennsylvania, American University, Haverford College, and most recently at Swarthmore College and Temple University.

He is the founder and executive director of the Scribe Video Center, a media arts center providing educational workshops for community groups and emerging independent media makers. Since 2005 he has served as executive producer of Precious Places, a Philadelphia video history project that tells histories of the city's communities as a collection short films conceived and produced by community members. With funding from the Pew Center for Arts & Heritage, he also directed a community film history project in 2014 called Muslim Voices of Philadelphia, which explored the history of Philadelphia's diverse Muslim communities (including Sufis, Sunnis, the Nation of Islam, the Ahmadis, the Moorish Science Temple of America, and others) through a series of short films.

Discussing the goals and achievement of the Scribe Video Center in a program for the Finger Lakes Environmental Film Festival (FLEFF) in 2020, Massiah described it as an effort of "participatory community video", which responded to issues such as gentrification and low-income housing shortages while aiming to develop new understandings of place and history, new visions of what the community can be, and new plans for civic engagement.  He noted that he had worked with UNICEF to establish similar programs in Haiti and Jamaica.

Awards
 1996 MacArthur Fellows Program
 1990, 1996 Tribeca Film Institute Fellow
 2009 Fleisher Founder's Award

Filmography
The Bombing of Osage Avenue (producer/director), 1986
Power! (co-producer/writer/director), 1990
A Nation of Law? (co-producer/writer/director), 1990
W.E.B. Du Bois: A Biography in Four Voices, 1996
Louise Thompson Patterson: In Her Own Words, 1996. A short film about activist Louise Thompson Patterson

References

External links
 

American filmmakers
Cornell University alumni
Massachusetts Institute of Technology alumni
City College of New York faculty
Princeton University faculty
Haverford College faculty
MacArthur Fellows
Living people
Year of birth missing (living people)
Friends Select School alumni
Artists from Philadelphia